Charles Lewis Tiffany (February 15, 1812 – February 18, 1902) was an American businessman and jeweler who founded New York City's Tiffany & Co. in 1837. Known for his jewelry expertise, Tiffany created the country's first retail catalog and introduced the English standard of sterling silver in imported jewelry in 1851.

Biography
Tiffany was born on February 15, 1812, in Killingly, Connecticut, the son of Chloe (Draper) and Comfort Tiffany. Tiffany was educated at a district school and an academy in Plainfield, Connecticut. Starting at the age of fifteen, he helped manage a small general store founded by his father, the owner of a cotton-manufacturing company. He later worked at the office of his father's mill. The Tiffany family descended from the immigrant Squire Humphrey Tiffany (England, 1630-Swansea, Massachusetts, 1685), who had lived in the Massachusetts Bay Colony since 1660.

In 1837, with $1,000 borrowed from his father, Tiffany and a school friend, John B. Young, set up a small stationery and gift shop in New York City. Their first day in business brought only $4.98 in sales, but two years later they were still in business, selling glassware, porcelain, cutlery, clocks, and jewelry. The store expanded in 1841, when the owners changed its name to Tiffany, Young, and Ellis. The store established a reputation for selling only the finest goods and specialized in Bohemian glass and porcelain. It also began manufacturing its own jewelry. In 1848, when political unrest in Europe depreciated the market in precious stones, Tiffany invested heavily in diamonds, which were sold at a great profit a few years later.

In 1853, the company was reorganized under the name Tiffany and Company, and opened branches in Paris (1850) and London (1868). The store also relocated uptown to a Fifth Avenue site in that decade. At the beginning of the American Civil War, foreseeing that the jewelry business would suffer, Tiffany turned most of his capital to the manufacture of swords, medals, and other war materials.

Tiffany was publicly embarrassed in an 1872 diamond and gemstone hoax perpetrated by Philip Arnold that cost investors more than half a million dollars.

In collaboration with Thomas Edison, Tiffany created footlights and other devices for theater lighting. As a result, Broadway shows became more popular.

The firm acquired and sold some of the French Crown Jewels in 1887, solidifying its reputation as merchants of high quality.

Charles Tiffany died at his home in Manhattan on February 18, 1902, at age ninety. At the time of his death, his company was capitalized at more than $2 million and was acknowledged as the most prominent jewelry company in North America.

Personal life
On November 30, 1841, Tiffany married John B. Young's sister, Harriet Olivia Avery Young (1817–1897), with whom he had six children: Charles Lewis Tiffany Jr. (1842–1847), Annie Olivia Tiffany Mitchell (1844–1937; grandmother of Hiram Bingham IV through her daughter Alfreda Mitchell; she was the first wife of Hiram Bingham III, one of the first explorers to Machu Picchu, Peru), Louis Comfort Tiffany (1848–1933), Louise Harriet Tiffany (1856–1937), Henry Charles Tiffany (1858–1859), and Burnett Young Tiffany (1860–1945).

Tiffany was a patron of the Metropolitan Museum of Art and one of the founders of the New York Society of Fine Arts.

Honors
Tiffany was made a chevalier of the Legion of Honor in 1878.

References

External links

Charles Lewis Tiffany Biography 

1812 births
1902 deaths
People from Killingly, Connecticut
American people of English descent
American jewellers
Purveyors to the Imperial and Royal Court
19th-century American businesspeople
Businesspeople from Connecticut
Chevaliers of the Légion d'honneur
Burials at Green-Wood Cemetery